Gilford is a surname of English origin, derived from Guildford, in Surrey.

The name was first recorded as "Gyldeford" in the Anglo-Saxon Chronicles, circa 800 AD, "Guldeford" in the Domesday Book of 1086, and "Geldeford" in the Pipe rolls between 1130 and 1156. The place name means "the ford where golden flowers grow", from the old English elements "gylde", which is a derivative of "gold", and "ford".

Notable people with the surname include:

Darren Gilford (born 1982), Maltese sprinter
David Gilford (born 1965), English golfer
Dorothy M. Gilford, American statistician
Gwynne Gilford (born 1946), American actress
Hastings Gilford (1861–1941), English surgeon
Jack Gilford (1908–1990), American actor
Madeline Lee Gilford (1923–2008), American actress
Yvonne Gilford (c.1941–1996), murdered Australian nurse
Zach Gilford (born 1982), American actor

References

English-language surnames